Poor Sinner is a 1923 German silent drama film directed by Pier Antonio Gariazzo and starring Alfred Abel, Diana Karenne and Fritz Kortner.

Cast
 Alfred Abel
 Diana Karenne as Nell
 Fritz Kortner as Canary
 Waldemar Potier

References

Bibliography
 Bock, Hans-Michael & Bergfelder, Tim. The Concise CineGraph. Encyclopedia of German Cinema. Berghahn Books, 2009.

External links

1923 films
Films of the Weimar Republic
German silent feature films
Films directed by Pier Antonio Gariazzo
German black-and-white films
1920s German films